The 2015–16 Nicholls State Colonels men's basketball team represented Nicholls State University during the 2015–16 NCAA Division I men's basketball season. The Colonels, led by twelfth year head coach J. P. Piper, played their home games at Stopher Gym and were members of the Southland Conference. They finished the season with a record of 11–23, 6–12 to finish in a three-way tie for 9th place in conference. They beat McNeese State in the first round of the Southland tournament to advance to the quarterfinals where they lost to Sam Houston State.

On March 29, head coach J. P. Piper was fired. He finished at Nicholls State with a 12 year record of 132–224.

Preseason 
The Colonels were picked to finish eleventh (11th) in both the Southland Conference Coaches' Poll and the Sports Information Directors Poll.

Roster

Schedule
Source 

|-
!colspan=9 style="background:#FF0000; color:white;"|  Exhibition

|-
!colspan=9 style="background:#FF0000; color:white;"| Regular season

|-
!colspan=9 style="background:#FF0000; color:white;"| Southland tournament

See also
2015–16 Nicholls State Colonels women's basketball team

References

Nicholls Colonels men's basketball seasons
Nicholls State
2015 in sports in Louisiana
2016 in sports in Louisiana